Lilleheden railway halt is a railway halt serving the eastern part of the town of Hirtshals in Vendsyssel, Denmark, as well as the nearby public aquarium Nordsøen Oceanarium.

The halt is located on the Hirtshals Line from Hirtshals to Hjørring. It opened in 1940, was closed again in 1956, but reopened in the 1990s. The train services are currently operated by the railway company Nordjyske Jernbaner which run frequent local train services between Hirtshals and Hjørring with onward connections from Hjørring to the rest of Denmark.

History 
The halt was opened on 1 May 1940. It was closed from 1943 to 1946 as it was located in an area used by the Wehrmacht during Nazi Germany's Occupation of Denmark.

The halt was closed again in 1956, but reopened in the 1990s.

Operations 
The train services are currently operated by Nordjyske Jernbaner which run frequent local train services between Hirtshals and Hjørring with onward connections from Hjørring to the rest of Denmark.

See also 
 List of railway stations in Denmark

References

Notes

Bibliography

External links

 Nordjyske Jernbaner – Danish railway company operating in North Jutland Region
 Danske Jernbaner – website with information on railway history in Denmark
 Nordjyllands Jernbaner – website with information on railway history in North Jutland

Railway stations in the North Jutland Region
Railway stations opened in 1940
Hirtshals
Railway stations in Denmark opened in the 20th century